Russell Taylor may refer to:
 Russell Taylor (architect), British architect
 Russell Taylor (cartoonist) (born 1960), British cartoonist, writer, journalist and composer
 Russell Taylor (director) of the Jared Foundation (non-profit organization established by Jared Fogle)
 Russell Taylor (musician), American singer and songwriter
 Russell Taylor (rugby union) (1914–1965), Wales international rugby union player
 Russell Taylor (journalist), British journalist

Fictional characters
 Russell Taylor (The Closer), fictional character in American TV series

See also
Russi Taylor (1944–2019), American voice actress